Bishop Dolan may refer to:

 Timothy Dolan, Roman Catholic Archbishop of New York
 Daniel Dolan, sedevacantist traditionalist Catholic bishop